Flop or FLOP may refer to:

Arts, entertainment and media
 Box-office flop or commercial flop, in the entertainment world

Film and television
 Flop (film), from Argentina
 Flop Show, an Indian TV sitcom
 The Flop House, a film podcast

Music
 Flop (band), a defunct 1990s era pop-punk group from Seattle, Washington, US
 Flop!, an industrial and synthpop album by the band And One
 Flop (album), by Maurizio Pisciottu

Science and technology
 Flop (algebraic geometry), a birational transformation
 Flop-transition, in the string theory of physics
 FLOPS (floating point operations per second), in computing
 Flopped image, a type of mirror image in photography, graphic design, and printing
 Wheel flop, a consequence of some bicycle and motorcycle geometries

Sports
 Flop (basketball), an intentional fall to claim a foul
 Diving (association football), intentional fall sometimes called flop in the US
 Diving (ice hockey)
 Flop shot, in golf
 Fosbury Flop, in high jump

Other uses
 Flop (poker), a poker term describing the first three cards dealt to the board
 Flophouse or flop house, a cheap transients' rooming house

See also
 Flip (disambiguation)
 Flip-flop (disambiguation)